Inter Airlines was a charter airline based in Antalya, Turkey. It operated holiday charter flights from Belgium, Germany and the Netherlands to Turkish resorts, as well as wet lease services for other airlines. Its main base was Antalya Airport.

Inter Airlines hold Jar-Ops 1 Air Operator Certificate and Jar-145 Maintenance Certificate issued by Republic Of Turkey Directorate General Of Civil Aviation, a member of the Joint Aviation Authorities (JAA).

History
The airline was established in December 1999 and operations started on 4 April 2002. It was wholly owned by Birce Tours and had 200 employees (at March 2007).

On 13 November 2008, the airline announced it stopped all flights, citing the global financial crisis of 2008 and increasing fuel prices as the two main reasons. All 3 aircraft were returned to their lessors. The company may possibly resurface as a tour operator.

Destinations

Inter Airlines operated full charters throughout Europe. Most of their flights were to the Netherlands, Belgium and Germany. Since the company's inception in April 2002, Inter Airlines was used by the biggest tour operators such as TUI AG and Thomas Cook AG as well as their branches KRAS (Netherlands) & Jetairfly (Belgium) (both part of the TUI group) and Neckermann (Thomas Cook Group).

Retired Fleet
The Inter Airlines fleet included the following aircraft (as of 11 September 2008):

3 Airbus A321-231

As of 2 April 2009, the average age of the Inter Airlines rented fleet was 8.1 years.

Before Bankruptcy
The airline also operated these aircraft before going bankrupt:

 3 Fokker 100
 2 Boeing 737-800

References

External links

Inter Airlines
Inter Airlines Fleet

Defunct airlines of Turkey
Airlines established in 1999
Airlines disestablished in 2008
Defunct charter airlines of Turkey
1999 establishments in Turkey